Rodrigo Malmierca Díaz (born October 14, 1956 in Havana) is a Cuban diplomat and politician. Mr. Malmierca is the Cuban Minister of Foreign Trade and Foreign Investment (2009–present) as a result of the 2009 shake-up by Raúl Castro.  He was the Permanent Representative of Cuba to the United Nations from 2005 to 2009. He is married to Grisell Guadalupe Castano-Rey and they have two children.

Education
Ambassador Malmierca Díaz graduated in economics at the University of Havana in 1980. He followed with several postgraduate courses, including at the Higher Institute of International Relations in Havana in international relations and negotiation techniques; at the External Trade Institute of the Ministry of Foreign Trade in Havana, in foreign trade, and at the Economic Commission for Latin America and the Caribbean (CEPAL) and Centro de Investigación y Docencia Económica (CIDE) (Economic Research Centre) in Mexico City, in economic alternatives for Latin America. He speaks four languages: Spanish, English, French and Portuguese.

Political life
Prior to his appointment to the UN, from 2002 to 2005 was Cuba's Ambassador to Belgium, the European Union and Luxembourg. From 1998 to 2002, he served as Deputy Minister in his country's Ministry of Foreign Investment and Economic Cooperation in Havana.  In that same Ministry, he served as Director of the European and North American Division from 1997 to 1998.  Prior to this, he was Counsellor in charge of economic and trade affairs at the Cuban Embassy in Brasília, Brazil, from 1992 to 1997.  From 1982 to 1992 he was Specialist of Cooperation in the Division of Economic International Institutions of the State Committee for Economic Cooperation in Havana.  He started his career in 1981 in Project Management of the ECIMETAL Enterprise, also in Havana.

References

 The Miami Herald, Cuban Economy: Purge Aims to Halt Cuba's Economic Free Fall, Sunday March 8, 2009, Page 1A.

External links
https://web.archive.org/web/20090306080555/http://www.granma.cubaweb.cu/pdf/martes/pagina5.pdf
http://www.wtopnews.com/?nid=105&sid=1614566
https://abcnews.go.com/International/wireStory?id=6992631
https://www.reuters.com/article/worldNews/idUSTRE52868R20090309
https://web.archive.org/web/20090401152243/http://www.periodico26.cu/english/news_cuba/mar2009/official-note030209.html
http://www.embacubalebanon.com/cur_min1.html

Cuban diplomats
Government ministers of Cuba
Living people
1956 births
Ambassadors of Cuba to Belgium
Ambassadors of Cuba to Luxembourg
Ambassadors of Cuba to the European Union
Permanent Representatives of Cuba to the United Nations
People from Havana
Communist Party of Cuba politicians
2000s in Cuba
2010s in Cuba
21st-century Cuban politicians